Alexandrovka is a rural locality (a selo) and the administrative center of Alexnadrovskoye Rural Settlement, Rossoshansky District, Voronezh Oblast, Russia. The population was 536 as of 2010. There are 13 streets.

Geography 
Alexandrovka is located 32 km southeast of Rossosh (the district's administrative centre) by road. Yelenovka is the nearest rural locality.

References 

Rural localities in Rossoshansky District